Novogeorgiyevka is a rural locality (a selo) in Mikhaylovsky Selsoviet of Mikhaylovsky District, Amur Oblast, Russia. The population was 26 as of 2018. There is 1 street.

Geography 
Novogeorgiyevka is located on the right bank of the Zavitaya River, 59 km north of Poyarkovo (the district's administrative centre) by road. Mikhaylovka is the nearest rural locality.

References 

Rural localities in Mikhaylovsky District, Amur Oblast